Nasrin Moazami is an Iranian medical microbiologist and biotechnologist. She received her Ph.D. in 1976, from the Faculty of Medicine at Laval University. Moazami is the pioneer of biotechnology and microalgae-based fuels in Iran.

Career
She established a research center in 1987, which is the only Regional Reference Center for Biotechnology in West and Central Asia. She is the founder of the Persian Type Culture Collection (PTCC), originally proposed by Iranian microbiologist Bozorgmehr Vaziri. She became an affiliated member of the World Federation for Culture Collections (WFCC) in 1985 and the MIRCEN International Network in 1992. The latter is a collection of microorganisms with industrial importance.

In 1986, Moazami managed a joint project of the Iranian Research Organization for Science and Technology (IROST) with UNDP and UNESCO, that evaluated “the feasibility of producing and using Bacillus thuringiensis to control malaria vectors in southern Iran. Their slow-release formulation was patented at the European Patent Office in 2003. The project was transferred to a private company that began production of 1000 T/y in 2French 004.

From 1990 to 2004, she was Head of the IROST Biotechnology Department, and from 2004 to 2010, served as the IROST Director of the Institute of Advanced Technology.

She established the Persian Gulf Biotechnology Research Center- now the Qeshm Microalgae Biorefinery in 1995 at Qehm Island, Iran. It is an important research center for applied research in marine biotechnology.

From 2001 to 2010, she was the principal investigator of an Iranian bio-diesel and bio-ethanol-based microalgae project.

In 2011 she became the manager of the National Project for scaling up microalgae-based diesel, ethanol and other valuable products of microalgae in Persian Gulf knowledge village.

In 2014 the expertise of the project was transferred to an Iranian private sector "Qeshm MicroAlgae Biorefinery" (QMAB). The first 100 hectares cultivation of MicroAlgae is under construction in Qeshm Island and will be expanded to 1000 hectares in three years by the company (www.qmabco.com).

In 2016 Professor Moazami was appointed as a member of the Scientific Board of the International Basic Sciences Program (IBSP) of UNESCO (http://en.irost.org/content/professor-nasrin-moazami-appointed-member-ibsp-unesco).

In 2022 the International Committee on Taxonomy of Viruses (ICTV) named a new genus, Moazamivirus, with three (3) species in honor of Professor Nasrin Moazami.

Recognition 

 On July 27, 1995, Moazami was presented with the "Chevalier de I'Ordre des Palmes Académiques" a citation for outstanding research. 
 In 1996, the President of Iran presented her the National Governmental Award for research.
 In 2007, Fourth Pioneer of Excellence recognized her contribution to improving quality of life in Queshm Island during the last 20 years.
 In 2015, the “Allameh Tabatabi Award,” as outstanding professional researcher of country.
 In 2016, the “European Award,” as "Woman Entrepreneur for Business competence licence" and 
 the “Alborz Foundation Award,” as outstanding professional scientist of country.

Selected publications

Moazami, N. (1997). "Large Scale Production of Slow Release Formation of Bacillus Thuringiensis M-H-4 in Qeshm Island." Proceeding of Second Technical Meeting & The First Regional Conference on Combating Malaria IROST, UNDP/UNESCO.
Moazami, N. (2001). "Revival of Saline and Desert Land, Using Biofertilizers, Micorrlizae, Biopolymer Supervater Absorbent and Biosaline Agriculture." The first International Conference on Biotechnology application for the arid regions 9–11 April Kuwait.
Moazami, N. (2002). "Biopesticides production." In Encyclopedia of Life Support Systems. EOLSS publishers Co. 3- Encyclopedias of Biological Physiological and Health Sciences.
Moazami,N. (2004). "Application of Synchrotron Radiation System in Nanobiotechnology and Biotechnology." Proceedings of 3-Sesame Users Meeting of Synchrotron-light for Experimental Science and Application in the Middle East, October 11–13, Antalya, Turkey.
Moazami, N. (2004). "Extremophile Culture Collection from Extreme area of Iran." Proceedings of 2nd International Congress on Traditional Medicine and Materia Media. October 4–7, Tehran, Iran.
Moazami, N. (2004). "The Role of Bacillus Thuringiensis H-14 In Malaria Control." The Forth Inter-country Meeting of National Malaria Program Manages. 22–25 May, Isfahan, Iran.

Moazami,N. (2005). "Overview of Novel Anticancer Drug Targets." Proceedings of the First International Symposium of Molecular Technology: Cell Cycle and Cell Death, Cellular and Molecular Perspectives, Basic and Clinical Aspects. July 2005, Tehran, Iran.
Moazami, N. (2007). "Biopesticides production, Encyclopedia of Life Support Systems." Industrial Biotechnology, Vol. 6, EOLSS publishers Co.

Moazami, N., Ranjbar, R., Ashori, A., Tangestani, M., Eghtesadi, R., Sheykhi Negad, A. (2011) "IROST Green Technology Pilot Plant: Microalgae Based Fuel." Proceeding of International workshop on Science and Technology policy and sustainable Development.5–7 January, Tehran IRAN.
Moazami, N., Ranjbar, R., Ashori, A., Tangestani, M., Sheyki Nejad, A. (2011). "Investigation on Biomass and Lipid Productivity of Iranian Cultivated Microalgae for Large Scale Biodiesel Production." First International Conference on Algal Biomass, Biofuels & Bioproducts, St. Louis, USA

Eurocert Cooperation in Granting European Patent to " A new Microalgae species and its application for Bio- energy production for animal and human consumption , in obtaining bioactive ingredient" http://eurocert.org.uk/Pages/view.aspx?PostID=1281

Moazami, N., Fatemeh Boshagh, and Khosrow Rostami, “Biohydrogen production by immobilized Enterobacter aerogenes on functionalized multi-walled carbon nanotube, International Journal of Hydrogen Energy 44/28 (2019), 14395-14405 https://doi.org/10.1016/j.ijhydene.2018.11.199
Moazami, N., Fatemeh Boshagh, and Khosrow Rostami, “Immobilization of Enterobacter aerogenes on carbon fiber and activated carbon to study hydrogen production enhancement,” Biochemical Engineering Journal 144 (2019), 64–72. https://doi.org/10.1016/j.bej.2019.01.014
Moazami, N., Mahroo Seyed Jafari Olia, Mehrdad Azin, Abbas Akhavan Sepahy, “Feasibility of improving carbohydrate content of Chlorella S4, a native isolate from the Persian Gulf using sequential statistical designs,” Biofuels 10 (2019). https://doi.org/10.1080/17597269.2019.1679572
Moazami, N., Mahroo Seyed Jafari Olia, Mehrdad Azin, Abbas Akhavan Sepahi, “Miniaturized culture method for the statistical study of growth rate and carbohydrate content of Picochlorum sp. D8 isolate from the Persian Gulf,” Renewable Energy 149 (2019) https://doi.org/10.1016/j.renene.2019.12.069
Moazami, N., Mahboobeh Akbarizare, Hamideh Ofoghi, Mahnaz Hadizadeh, “In Vitro Assessment of the Cytotoxic Effects of Secondary Metabolites from Spirulina Platensis on Heptocellullar Carcinoma,” Egyptian Liver Journal 10/11, 2020  https://doi.org/10.1186/s43066-020-0018-3
Moazami, N., Salma Karamad Yazdanabad, Abdolreza Samimi, Soheila Shokrollahzadeh, Davood Mohebbi Kalhori, María José Ibánez González, Tania Mazzuca Sobczuk, and Emilio Molina Grima, “Microalgae biomass dewatering by forward osmosis: Review and critical challenges, Algal Research 56, 2021 https://doi.org/10.1016/j.algal.2021.102323
Moazami, N., Mahroo Seyed Jafari Olia, Mehrdad Azin, Abbas Akhavan Sepahi, “Screening of microalgae isolates of the Persian Gulf and evaluation of their potential as the promising bioethanol feedstock,” International Journal of Green Energy, 2021 https://doi.org/10.1080/15435075.2021.1968872
Moazami, N., Mahroo Seyed Jafari Olia, Mehrdad Azin, “Application of a statistical design to evaluate bioethanol production from chlorella S4 biomass after acid –Thermal pretreatment,” Renewable Energy 182, 2021   https://doi.org/10.1016/j.renene.2021.10.019
Moazami, N., Mahbobe Ghanbarzadeh, Mohammad Hassan Shahavi, Saeed Mirdamadi, “Study of bioactive compounds in Arthrospira platensis MGH‑1 fortified with micronutrients of iron, zinc, and manganese,” Journal of Applied Phycology 34, 2022 <https://doi.org/10.1007/s10811-022-02797-w>

Books

Collection of Fungi and Industrial and Infectious Bacteria in Iran (in Persian), Tehran: IROST, 1989;
Introduction to biotechnology research and development (in Persian), Tehran: Taribat Modares University Press, Tehran, 1990;
Combating Malaria: A Collection of articles, Tehran: IROST, 1997;
Biology and Biotechnology of the Sea (in Persian), Tehran: National Institute of Genetic Engineering and Biotechnology, 2011.
Microalgae-Biotechnology (زیست شناسی و زیست فناوری ریز جلبک ها), Tehran: Iran University Press, 2018.

References

Sources

 "Countries unite against malaria". UNESCO Natural Sciences Portal (UNESCO). May 2005.
 "Controlling malaria, the vampire of the technological age". A World of Science (UNESCO). April–June 2005. 
 "Middle East Connections". Chemical & Engineering News. 28 January 2008.

External links
 
 
 Renewable Energy Global Innovations 

Living people
Iranian microbiologists
21st-century Iranian inventors
Year of birth missing (living people)
Université Laval alumni
Recipients of the Order of Research
Iranian biotechnologists
Academic staff of Isfahan University of Medical Sciences